Pietro Vecchia, O.S.B. (8 January 1628 – July 1695) was a Roman Catholic prelate who served as Bishop of Molfetta (1691–1695) and Bishop of Andria (1690–1691).

Biography
Pietro Vecchia was born in Venice, Italy on 8 January 1628 and ordained a priest in the Order of Saint Benedict. On 6 March 1690, he was appointed during the papacy of Pope Alexander VIII as Bishop of Andria. On 6 March 1690, he was consecrated bishop by Pietro Francesco Orsini de Gravina, Archbishop of Benevento, with Giuseppe Bologna, Archbishop Emeritus of Benevento, and Gregorio Giuseppe Gaetani de Aragonia, Titular Archbishop of Neocaesarea in Ponto, serving as co-consecrators. On 19 December 1691, he was appointed during the papacy of Pope Innocent XII as Bishop of Molfetta. He served as Bishop of Molfetta until his death in July 1695.

Episcopal succession
While bishop, Vecchia was the principal co-consecrator of:
Bartolomeo Riberi, Bishop of Nicotera (1691);
Carolus de Tilly, Bishop of Acerra (1692); and
Francesco Antonio Triveri, Bishop of Andria (1692).

References

External links and additional sources
 (for Chronology of Bishops) 
 (for Chronology of Bishops) 
 (for Chronology of Bishops) 
 (for Chronology of Bishops) 

17th-century Italian Roman Catholic bishops
Bishops appointed by Pope Alexander VIII
Bishops appointed by Pope Innocent XII
1628 births
1695 deaths
Benedictine bishops
Bishops of Molfetta